Plex Systems, Inc. is a software company based in Troy, Michigan. The company develops and markets the Plex Manufacturing Cloud, a software as a service (SaaS) or cloud computing ERP for manufacturing.

Overview
Plex Systems began as an internal IT project at an automotive parts manufacturer, MSP Industries Corporation, in 1989. The company was formed as Plexus Systems LLC in 1995 by Robert Beatty, providing client/server manufacturing software. The company began offering its software via the software as a service (SaaS) or cloud computing model when Plexus Online was launched in 2001.

In 2006 Apax Partners acquired a majority interest in the company. In 2009, the company changed its name to Plex Systems and renamed its flagship product Plex Online. On June, 2012, the company announced the acquisition from a group of share holders, including Apax Partners by Francisco Partners. In June 2012, Accel Partners invested $30 million in Plex: In June 2014, Plex secured $50 million in additional funding led by T. Rowe Price, which joined existing investors Francisco Partners and Accel Partners. The investment will be used to support expanded product development, as well as investments in marketing and sales.In June 2021, Plex was acquired by Rockwell Automation $2.22 billion in cash.

Aberdeen Group suggested in its "Aberdeen AXIS: ERP in Manufacturing 2009” report that Plex Systems was among the top four performing ERP vendors. Plex was the only ERP software solution provider placed entirely within the “Champion” performance category, just ahead of SAP AG. (There is evidence of Plex acting as a sponsor for Aberdeen Group so this report from Aberdeen may be biased) However, other vendors evaluated in the same report are also sponsors of Aberdeen Group.

Historically, the company has not released detailed financial information, citing its status as a privately held corporation. However, in May 2012, the company reported a revenue increase of 30.6% in the first quarter ending March 31, compared to a year earlier. Recurring revenue increased by 30.5 percent, representing the 19th consecutive quarter of growth."

Plex is known as the first provider of a complete SaaS ERP solution for manufacturing companies. Several IT software bloggers have written about Plex’s ability to provide a wide scope of critical features for manufacturers in a SaaS model, where larger ERP vendors had not succeeded at the time.

The Plex Manufacturing Cloud
The Plex Manufacturing Cloud is a software as a service (SaaS) or cloud application ERP that manages the manufacturing process and supports the functions of production, inventory, shipping, supply-chain management, quality, accounting, sales, and human resource departments, in addition to the traditional ERP roles of finance/accounting, procurement, human capital management, etc. Plex is targeted towards manufacturing industries with rigorous traceability, quality and food safety requirements, including automotive, aerospace, food & beverage, and life sciences or medical manufacturing. The system must be accessed using a web browser, making its functions available from anywhere with an Internet connection. The software is designed to provide managers and engineers with real-time visibility to production data.

While Plex Systems calls the SaaS solution "ERP", the software also includes the following integrated functions:
 Enterprise resource planning (ERP):
 Manufacturing execution system (MES) or manufacturing operations management (MOM)
 Quality management systems (QMS). It helps maintain compliance with quality standards including ISO 9000 and ISO 14000, QS-9000, TS-16949, AS-9100, etc.
 Customer relationship management (CRM)
 Supply chain management software (SCMS):

Software as a service (SaaS) or cloud application
The Plex Manufacturing Cloud is built on a multi-tenant architecture. Software as a service (SaaS) (also referred to as cloud application) is an application delivery model in which the user accesses software over the Internet, from anywhere, at any time. The physical location and ownership/maintenance burden of the system that actually serves the software is outside the responsibility and concern of the end users. Some IT professionals have expressed concern about moving ERP to a SaaS model. At the same time many companies have successfully performed such deployments with Plex Systems and other providers.
SaaS applications are deployed atop the platform layer of the cloud computing stack. These applications tend to be sold as a subscription, shifting the burden of the software cost across the useful life of the software, and tend to be accounted as an operating expense (OpEx). This is in contrast to traditional methods that require upfront payment or financing and tend to be accounted as a capital expense (CapEx).

See also
 List of ERP software packages
 List of ERP vendors

References

1995 establishments in Michigan
American companies established in 1995
Cloud computing providers
Companies based in Troy, Michigan
ERP software companies
Production and manufacturing software
Software companies based in Michigan
Software companies established in 1995
Software companies of the United States